The Binghamton Rumble Ponies are an American Minor League Baseball team based in Binghamton, New York. The team, which plays in the Eastern League, is the Double-A affiliate of the New York Mets major-league club. The Rumble Ponies play in Mirabito Stadium, located in Binghamton.

History
In 1976, the franchise played as the Williamsport Bills in Williamsport, Pennsylvania. It played in Jersey City, New Jersey, in 1977 and 1978, then Buffalo, New York, from 1979 through 1984.

It returned to Williamsport in 1987. The team was an affiliate of the Cleveland Indians in 1987 and 1988, and of the Seattle Mariners during the 1989 and 1990 seasons. (The Bills franchise was actually two separate franchises. After the 1988 season, the original owners moved the Bills to Hagerstown, Maryland, while the Eastern League franchise based in Pittsfield, Massachusetts, moved back to Williamsport before the 1989 season.)

It was purchased by the New York Mets in 1991, and moved to Binghamton in 1992 as the Binghamton Mets.

In 2016, the franchise announced a plan to stay in Binghamton for the foreseeable future, and to change the team's name. The team held a name-the-team contest on its website from May 17 to June 1; the finalists were the Bullheads (for the bullhead catfish abundant in the nearby Susquehanna River), Gobblers (for the rich hunting culture of the area, as well as the turkeys in Binghamton), Rocking Horses (for the Triple Cities' nickname as the "Carousel Capital of The World"), Rumble Ponies (also a carousel tribute), Stud Muffins (for the collections of carousel horses in Binghamton), and Timber Jockeys (for everyone who rides the carousels). On November 3, 2016, the team announced that it would be rebranding as the Binghamton Rumble Ponies, and released a new logo.

In 2019, Major League Baseball released a proposal to sever ties with 42 minor-league teams, including the Rumble Ponies and fellow Double-A teams such as the Erie SeaWolves and Chattanooga Lookouts, in 2021. On November 10, 2020, the Mets announced they would continue their affiliation with Binghamton, saving the Rumble Ponies from elimination. The team was organized into the Double-A Northeast. In 2022, the Double-A Northeast became known as the Eastern League, the name historically used by the regional circuit prior to the 2021 reorganization.

Roster

Season records

(Place indicates finish in Eastern League from 1987 to 1993, in the Northern Division from 1994 to 2009, in the Eastern Division from 2010 to 2020, and in the Northeastern Division from 2021. Italics indicates league champions.)

Williamsport Bills
1987: 60–79 (7th), managers Steve Swisher & Orlando Gomez
1988: 66–73 (6th), manager Mike Hargrove
1989: 63–77 (7th), manager Jay Ward
1990: 61–79 (7th), manager Rich Morales
1991: 60–79 (7th), manager Clint Hurdle

Binghamton Mets

1992: 79–59 (2nd), manager Steve Swisher
1993: 68–72 (5th), manager Steve Swisher
1994: 82–59 (1st), manager John Tamargo
1995: 67–75 (4th), manager John Tamargo
1996: 76–66 (2nd), manager John Tamargo
1997: 66–76 (4th), manager Rick Sweet
1998: 82–60 (2nd), manager John Gibbons
1999: 54–88 (6th), manager Doug Davis
2000: 82–58 (1st), manager Doug Davis
2001: 73–68 (4th), manager Howie Freiling
2002: 73–68 (3rd), manager Howie Freiling
2003: 63–78 (5th), manager John Stearns
2004: 76–66 (2nd), manager Ken Oberkfell
2005: 63–79 (6th), manager Jack Lind
2006: 70–70 (3rd), manager Juan Samuel
2007: 61–81 (6th), manager Mako Oliveras
2008: 73–69 (3rd), manager Mako Oliveras
2009: 54–86 (6th), manager Mako Oliveras
2010: 66–76 (5th), manager Tim Teufel
2011: 65–76 (5th), manager Wally Backman
2012: 68–74 (5th), manager Pedro López
2013: 86–55 (2nd), manager Pedro López
2014: 83–59 (1st), manager Pedro López
2015: 77-64 (2nd), manager Pedro López
2016: 63-77 (5th), manager Pedro López

Binghamton Rumble Ponies

2017: 85-54 (2nd), manager Luis Rojas
2018: 64-76 (5th), manager Luis Rojas
2019: 67-73 (4th), manager Kevin Boles
2020: Season canceled due to COVID-19 pandemic
2021: 47-60 (4th), manager Lorenzo Bundy
2022: 53-83 (6th), manager Reid Brignac

Playoffs

References

External links

 
 Statistics from Baseball-Reference

 
Baseball teams established in 1992
Eastern League (1938–present) teams
Baseball in Binghamton, New York
Professional baseball teams in New York (state)
Cleveland Guardians minor league affiliates
New York Mets minor league affiliates
Companies based in Binghamton, New York
1992 establishments in New York (state)
Double-A Northeast teams